Roman Moravec (30 December 1950 – 2 November 2009) was a Slovak athlete. He competed in the men's high jump at the 1972 Summer Olympics.

References

1950 births
2009 deaths
Athletes (track and field) at the 1972 Summer Olympics
Slovak male high jumpers
Olympic athletes of Czechoslovakia
Sportspeople from Bratislava
Universiade bronze medalists for Czechoslovakia
Universiade medalists in athletics (track and field)
Medalists at the 1973 Summer Universiade